South Lyon Community Schools is an accredited public school district headquartered in South Lyon, Michigan in the Metro Detroit area. It serves  of area. 

The school district was originally created in 1876.

Service area
In Oakland County the district includes all of South Lyon, most of Lyon Charter Township, and sections of Milford Charter Township, Novi, and Wixom. In Washtenaw County the district includes sections of Northfield Township and Salem Township. In Livingston County the district includes sections of Green Oak Township and Whitmore Lake.

Schools 
South Lyon High School
South Lyon East High School
Millennium Middle School 
Centennial Middle School 
Salem Elementary 
Sayre Elementary 
Bartlett Elementary 
Dolsen Elementary 
Hardy Elementary 
Kent Lake Elementary
Brummer Elementary
Pearson Elementary

References

External links

South Lyon Community Schools Official Site

School districts in Michigan
Education in Oakland County, Michigan
Education in Livingston County, Michigan
Education in Washtenaw County, Michigan
1876 establishments in Michigan
Novi, Michigan
School districts established in 1876